Slade Point is a coastal town and peninsular suburb in the Mackay Region, Queensland, Australia.

Geography 

The waters and inlets of the Coral Sea form the northern boundary and most of the eastern.

Slade Point has the following coastal features:

 Slade Bay

 Slade Point

 Lamberts Beach

History 
The first British people to visit the area were the crew and passengers aboard the ketch Presto which pulled into the bay at Slade Point in June 1862 after having difficulty entering the Pioneer River. A crew member was killed by Aboriginal people, while Mr Roberts, a passenger, was either killed or taken away by Aboriginal people. Armed crew-members formed a search party but were unable to locate Roberts. Another larger search party, assisted by troopers of the Native Police, was later organised but no trace of Roberts was found.

Amhurst State School opened on 11 April 1939. It was renamed Slade Point State School in 1967.

Around 1975, a Catholic church opened at 8 Finch Street. It has subsequently closed and has been converted into a residence, but the cross at the western end of the building remains intact.

Education 
Slade Point State School is a government primary (Prep-6) school for boys and girls at 362 Slade Point Road. In 2017, the school had an enrolment of 110 students with 13 teacher (11 full-time equivalent) and 11 non-teaching staff (8 full-time equivalent). In 2018, the school had an enrolment of 204 students with 13 teachers (12 full-time equivalent) and 16 non-teaching staff (10 full-time equivalent).

There is no secondary school in Slade Point. The nearest government secondary school is Pioneer State High School in neighbouring Andergrove to the south-west.

Amenities 
Slade Point Central shopping centre (formerly Seagull Shopping Centre) is at 1-7 Finch Street. Slade Point Post Office is in this centre.

The Mackay Regional Council operates a mobile library service on a fortnightly schedule at Pheasant Street.

Slade Point Community Hall is at 4 Wren Street.

Mackay RSL Memorial Bowls Club (also known as Slade Point Bowls Club) is at 30 Wren Street.

Life Giving Church (formerly Slade Point Christian Life Centre) is at 34 Robin Street. It is affiliated with Australian Christian Churches.

Attractions 
Lamberts Beach Lookout is off the Pacific Esplanade. It offers coastal views and view of passing whales (during the migration season).

The Slade Point water tower has been used to create a mural by Scott Nagy and Cara Sanders, which depicts the whale migration and the local red-tailed black cockatoos seen on the esplanade. It is at 1 Albatross Street.

References

External links

 

Towns in Queensland
Suburbs of Mackay, Queensland